Stand and Deliver is a 1988 film.

Stand and Deliver may also refer to:

Film and television
 Stand and Deliver (1928 film), a 1928 silent film
 "Stand and Deliver" (Supergirl), an episode of Supergirl
 NXT Stand & Deliver, an annual professional wrestling pay-per-view event produced by WWE

Music
 "Stand and Deliver" (Adam and the Ants song), 1981
 "Stand and Deliver" (Mr. Mister song), 1987
 "Stand and Deliver" (Eric Clapton song), 2020 
 "Stand & Deliver", a 1981 song by Bram Tchaikovsky from the album Funland
 "Stand and Deliver", a 2004 song by Airbourne from Ready to Rock
 "Stand and Deliver (Shoot 'em Down)", a 2023 song by Lovebites from Judgement Day

Other
 Stand and Deliver, a painting by N. C. Wyeth

See also
 Highwayman, a robber who stole from travellers often using this phrase